Thunderbunny is a comic book about a boy who transforms into a superhero resembling a large pink humanoid rabbit. It was created by Martin Greim.

Publication history
Thunderbunny's first appearance published by a major company was Charlton Bullseye #6 (Mar. 1982), published by Charlton Comics. Thunderbunny made a subsequent appearance in that title's 10th issue.

The character then moved briefly to Archie Comics, appearing in Thunderbunny #1 as part of Red Circle Comics, a short-lived revival of the Archie Comics superhero characters. Thunderbunny appeared in Blue Ribbon Comics #13 (Oct.1984), co-starring in a story also featuring the Fly, the Shield, the Web and the Jaguar, The Mighty Crusaders #7, and Pep Comics #393 (March 1984).

Thunderbunny then moved to WaRP Graphics for a six-issue run (June 1985 – Feb. 1986), with an additional story in Warp Graphics Annual #1. Issues #7–12 were published by Apple Comics (Apr. 1986 – Nov. 1987).

Character history
Thunderbunny was the last survivor of an alien race of humanoid animals. The essence of this world's greatest hero was transferred into a special box-shaped device and subtly presented to a young boy named Bobby Caswell.

When Bobby placed his hands in two hand-shaped impressions on the box, power transferred into his body and gave him the ability to transform into Thunderbunny.  His powers include super-strength and flight.

Bobby finds the bunny form to be embarrassing. Furthermore, the longer he stays in that form, the more difficult it is to form the essential mental image of his original form to change back. This combination of concerns makes him most reluctant to use his superhero identity, but he has still had adventures as Thunderbunny.

See also
Hoppy the Marvel Bunny
Captain Carrot
Tonde Burin - Similar story of a human transforming into an anthropomorphic superhero

References

External links
Thunderbunny's page at International Superheroes

Charlton Comics superheroes
WaRP Graphics titles
1982 comics debuts
Comics characters introduced in 1982
Fictional rabbits and hares
Animal superheroes
Archie Comics superheroes
Archie Comics titles
Comics about rabbits and hares
Comics characters with superhuman strength
Extraterrestrial superheroes
Shapeshifter characters in comics